Metalized is the debut album by the Canadian heavy metal band Sword. It was released in 1986 by the Canadian indie label Aquarius Records. The album samples many subgenres of the heavy metal genre, such as thrash metal on "Outta Control".

Track listing
 "F.T.W." – 3:38 – (Music : Rick Hughes / Mike Plant / M Larock / D Hughes) (Lyrics : Rick Hughes / Derek Rodrigues)
 "Children Of Heaven" – 2:38 – (Music : R Hughes / M Plant / M Larock / D Hughes) (Lyrics : R Hughes / M Plant / Derek Rodrigues)
 "Stoned Again" – 3:27 – (Music : Rick Hughes / Mike Plant / Mike Larock / Dan Hughes) (Lyrics : Rick Hughes  / Derek Rodrigues)
 "Dare To Spit" – 3:45 – (Music by Rick Hughes / Mike Plant / Mike Larock / Dan Hughes) (Lyrics : Rick Hughes / Derek Rodrigues)
 "Outta Control" – 3:00 – (Music by Rick Hughes / Mike Plant / Mike Larock / Dan Hughes) (Lyrics : Rick Hughes)
 "The End Of The Night" – 3:00 – (Music by Rick Hughes / Mike Plant / Mike Larock / Dan Hughes) (Lyrics  : Rick Hughes) 
 "Runaway" – 3:38 – (Music by Rick Hughes / Mike Plant / Mike Larock / Dan Hughes) (Lyrics : Rick Hughes) 
 "Where To Hide" – 3:43 – (Music : Rick Hughes / Mike Plant / Mike Larock / Dan Hughes) (Lyrics : Rick Hughes) 
 "Stuck In Rock" – 3:37 – (Music : R Hughes / M Plant / M Larock / D Hughes) (Lyrics : R Hughes / M Plant / D Rodrigues)
 "Evil Spell" – 4:14 – (Music : Rick Hughes / Mike Plant / Mike Larock / Dan Hughes (Lyrics : Rick Hughes / Derek Rodrigues)

Personnel
 Rick Hughes - Vocals, Keyboards
 Mike Plant - Guitar, Keyboards
 Mike Larock - Bass
 Dan Hughes - Drums

Production
 Pierre Paradis - Producer
 Sword - Producer
 Joe Primeau - Engineer
 Billy Szawlowski - Engineer
 Gary Moffet - Engineer
 Garth Richardson - Assistant Engineer
 James "Cowboy" Carrier - Assistant Engineer
 Paul Gross - Coordination
 Bob Lemm - Graphic Design
 Jacques Larue - Illustrations
 Marc Bélanger - Photography

References

Sword (band) albums
1986 debut albums
Aquarius Records (Canada) albums